There are over 20,000 Grade II* listed buildings in England. This page is a list of these buildings in the district of Chiltern in Buckinghamshire.

List

|}

See also
 Grade I listed buildings in Buckinghamshire
 Grade II* listed buildings in Buckinghamshire
 Grade II* listed buildings in South Bucks
 Grade II* listed buildings in Wycombe
 Grade II* listed buildings in Aylesbury Vale
 Grade II* listed buildings in Borough of Milton Keynes

Notes

Lists of Grade II* listed buildings in Buckinghamshire